Bak Jin (25 August 1560 – March 1597), also known as Park Jin, was a Korean Joseon Dynasty Army general and politician. He was one of the Korean generals of the Imjin War.

Battle of Kyongju
During the  Imjin War, Bak Jin fought to recapture the city of Kyongju from the Japanese invaders. His first attack was repelled, but he returned with a mortar and fired a delayed-action bomb over the wall. The Japanese evacuated the city rather than defend it against such mortars.

See also 
 Japanese invasions of Korea
 Yi Sun-sin
 Kwon Yul
 Jeong Bal

References

External links 
 Bak Jin 
 Bak Jin 

1560 births
1597 deaths
Korean admirals
Korean generals
Military history of Korea
16th-century Korean people
Korean military personnel killed in action
People of the Japanese invasions of Korea (1592–1598)